The El Wak Stadium is a multi-purpose stadium in Cantonments, a suburb of Accra. It is owned by the Ghana Armed Forces and has a seating capacity of 7,000. It was the home venue of Inter Allies, in the 2016/2017 Ghanaian Premier League season.

References

Football venues in Ghana